Melaleuca parvistaminea is a plant in the myrtle family, Myrtaceae, and is endemic to the states of New South Wales and Victoria in Australia.  It has hard, rough bark, cream coloured flowers and leaves in whorls of three around the stems.

Description
Oil glands are distinct on the lower surface.

The flowers are arranged in a short spike or head at the ends of branches which continue to grow after flowering and sometimes in the upper leaf axils. The flowers are a light cream colour and each is surrounded by five bundles of stamens, containing 3 to 8 stamens.

Taxonomy and naming
Melaleuca parvistaminea was first formally described in 1984 by Norman Byrnes in Austrobaileya. The specific epithet (parvistaminea) is derived from the Latin words parvus meaning "little" and stamen meaning "thread" referring to the stamens which are short compared to those of other melaleucas.

Distribution and habitat
Melaleuca parvistaminea occurs from the Shoalhaven district in New South Wales south to the Seymour district in Victoria. It grows in forest, woodland and grassland, often occurring in thickets, usually along watercourses, in sandy or clayey soil.

References

parvistaminea
Myrtales of Australia
Flora of Western Australia
Plants described in 1984
Taxa named by Norman Brice Byrnes